The Gourdou-Leseurre GL-832 HY was a 1930s French light shipboard reconnaissance floatplane designed and built by Gourdou-Leseurre for the French Navy.

Development
In 1930 the French Navy issued a requirement for a light coastal patrol seaplane mainly for use in the French colonies. Gourdou-Leseurre built and designed a prototype GL-831 HY which was a modification of the companies earlier GL-830 HY with a smaller Hispano-Suiza radial engine. The GL-831 HY first flew on 23 December 1931. In 1933 the French Navy ordered 22 aircraft designated GL-832 HY, this had a less powerful engine than the prototype. The GL-832 HY was a metal construction low-wing monoplane with fabric covered wings and twin floats. The aircraft had a large wing to take the stresses of a catapult launch, the wings also folded to allow stowage on board a ship. Unusually the braced-horizontal tailplane was attached to the underside of the rear fuselage. Two open cockpits in tandem were provided for the two crew, each cockpit having a windscreen. The first production aircraft flew on 17 December 1934 and the last on 12 February 1936.

Operational history
The French Navy used the GL-832 HY on second-line cruisers like the Emile Bertin and Primauguet and on smaller colonial sloops. The smaller sloops did not have a catapult and the aircraft were lowered into the sea using a crane. The aircraft were still operational at the start of the Second World War and were not retired until 1941.

Variants
GL-830 HY
Prototype with one 350hp (261 kW) Hispano-Suiza 9Qdr radial engine, one built.
GL-831 HY
Prototype with one 250 hp (186 kW) Hispano-Suiza 9Qa radial engine, one built.
GL-832 HY
Production version with one 230 hp (171 kW) Hispano-Suiza 9Qb radial engine, 22 built.

Operators

French Navy

Specifications (GL-832 HY)

See also

References

 The Illustrated Encyclopedia of Aircraft (Part Work 1982–1985), 1985, Orbis Publishing, Page 1994

1930s French military reconnaissance aircraft
Floatplanes
GL-832
Single-engined tractor aircraft
Low-wing aircraft
Aircraft first flown in 1931